Christian Bök, FRSC (born August 10, 1966 in Toronto, Canada) is a Canadian poet known for unusual and experimental works. He is the author of Eunoia, which won the Canadian Griffin Poetry Prize.

Life and work
He was born "Christian Book", but uses "Bök" as a pseudonym.

He began writing seriously in his early twenties, while earning his B.A. and M.A. degrees at Carleton University in Ottawa. He returned to Toronto in the early 1990s to study for a Ph.D. in English literature at York University, where he encountered a burgeoning literary community that included Steve McCaffery, Christopher Dewdney, and Darren Wershler-Henry.  he teaches at the University of Calgary.  As of 2022 He teaches at Charles Darwin University in Melbourne, Australia. 

In 1994, Bök published Crystallography, "a pataphysical encyclopaedia that misreads the language of poetics through the conceits of geology." The Village Voice said of it: "Bök's concise reflections on mirrors, fractals, stones, and ice diabolically change the way you think about language — his, yours — so that what begins as description suddenly seems indistinguishable from the thing itself." Crystallography was reissued in 2003, and was nominated for a Gerald Lampert Award.

Bök is a sound poet and has performed an extremely condensed version of the "Ursonate" by Kurt Schwitters. He has created conceptual art, making artist's books from Rubik's Cubes and Lego bricks. He has also worked in science-fiction television by constructing artistic languages for Gene Roddenberry's Earth: Final Conflict and Peter Benchley's Amazon.

Eunoia
Bök is most famous for Eunoia (2001), a book which took him seven years to write. Eunoia consists of univocalics: The book uses only one vowel in each of its five chapters. In the book's main part, each chapter used just a single vowel, producing sentences such as this: "Enfettered, these sentences repress free speech." Bök believes "his book proves that each vowel has its own personality, and demonstrates the flexibility of the English language."

Edited by Darren Wershler-Henry and published by Coach House Books,
in 2001, Eunoia won the 2002 Griffin and sold 20,000 copies. Canongate published "Eunoia" in Britain in Oct. 2008. The book was also a bestseller there, reaching #8 on the Top 10 bestselling charts for the year.

The Xenotext experiment
The Xenotext is an ongoing work of BioArt which claims to be “the first example of ‘living poetry.’” The central experiment is twofold: first, a poem is encoded as a sequence of DNA which is then implanted into a viable bacterium; second, the bacterium reads this sequence of DNA and produces a protein that, according to the initial cipher, is also an intelligible poem. The final product, according to Bök in a 2007 interview, will include:

Bök is collaborating with laboratories at the University of Calgary, DNA 2.0, and the University of Wyoming to realize his design. In 2011, nine years after conceiving The Xenotext experiment, Bök announced the university’s labs had performed a successful test run of his “poetic cipher,” meaning that:

In 2015, The Xenotext: Book I was published. This first volume, consisting of meditations on science, poetry, human intervention, and myth, “sets the conceptual groundwork for the second volume, which will document the experiment itself.”The Xenotext: Book II remains forthcoming.

The Kazimir Effect 
Since 2017, Bök has been working on a visual poetry project inspired by Suprematist Composition: White on White by Kazimir Malevich. This project culminated in the publication of a book titled The Kazimir Effect (Penteract Press, 2021), which was listed as one of the Times Literary Supplement’s Books of the Year 2021.

Recognition
Eunoia won the Griffin Poetry Prize in 2002.

Bök's poem "Vowels" was used in the lyrics of a song on the EP A Quick Fix of Melancholy (2003) by the Norwegian band Ulver.

In 2006, Christian Bök and his work were the subject of an episode of the television series Heart of a Poet, produced by Canadian filmmaker Maureen Judge.

On May 31, 2011, The BBC World Service broadcast Bök reading "The Xenotext."

Bibliography 
 Crystallography. Coach House (1994) 
 Eunoia. Coach House Books (2001)  - winner of the 2002 Canadian Griffin Poetry Prize
 Pataphysics: The Poetics of an Imaginary Science. Northwestern University Press (2001)  - See ’Pataphysics
 The Xenotext (Book 1). Coach House Books (2015) 
The Kazimir Effect. Penteract Press (2021) ISBN 978-1-913421-11-3

As editor
 Ground Works: Avante-Garde for Thee (2003) 

Included in
 Poetry Plastique (2001) 
 The Griffin Poetry Prize Anthology : A Selection of the 2002 Shortlist (2002)

See also

 List of Canadian writers
 List of Canadian poets
 Concrete poetry
 Sound poetry

References

External links 
 Christian Bök pages on UbuWeb, including recordings, poetry, and essays
 Christian Bök on Twitter
 Griffin Poetry Prize biography
 Griffin Poetry Prize reading, including video clip
 University of Calgary Faculty of English profile
 Eunoia online book
 "Bazaar of the Bizarre: The Book of Horrors" - Christian Bök's first publication
 Christian Bök interview and reading on CBC Radio program And Sometimes Y, episode 5, July 25, 2006
 Podcasts recorded at the Institut du Monde Anglophone, Université Paris 3 – Sorbonne Nouvelle, on May 22, 2008
Christian Bök at University of Toronto Libraries
Records of Christian Bök are held by Simon Fraser University's Special Collections and Rare Books

1966 births
Living people
York University alumni
Carleton University alumni
Academic staff of the University of Calgary
Writers from Toronto
20th-century Canadian poets
20th-century Canadian male writers
Canadian male poets
21st-century Canadian poets
21st-century Canadian male writers
Visual poets